Betrayed or The Betrayed may refer to:

 Betrayal, a violation of trust

Film and television
 Betrayed (1917 film), an American silent film by Raoul Walsh
 Betrayed (1954 film), an American war drama directed by Gottfried Reinhardt
 Betrayed (1988 film), an American thriller directed by Costa-Gavras
 The Betrayed (1993 film), a Dutch television drama directed by Frans Weisz
 The Betrayed (1995 film), a British television documentary directed by Clive Gordon
 Betrayed (2003 film), a film featuring Alex House
 The Betrayed (2008 film), an American thriller by Amanda Gusack
 "Betrayed" (Law & Order: Criminal Intent), a television episode
 "Betrayed" (Scream), a television episode
 Betrayed (TV series), an American crime series nominated at the 1st Critics' Choice Real TV Awards

Literature
 Betrayed (Cast novel), a 2007 House of Night novel by P. C. Cast and Kristin Cast
 Betrayed, a 2010 novel by Claire Robyns
 The Betrayed, a 2014 novel by Heather Graham Pozzessere
 The Betrayed, a novel by Michael Horbach, translated in 1959 by Robert Kee

Music
 The Betrayed (Lostprophets album), 2010
 Betrayed (Can't Trust Nobody) or the title song, an album by Nationwide Rip Ridaz, 1999
 "Betrayed" (Lil Xan song), 2017
 "Betrayed", a song by Avenged Sevenfold from City of Evil
 "Betrayed", a song by Dream Evil from Children of the Night

See also 
 Betrayal (disambiguation)